L'immensità is a 2022 French-Italian drama film directed by Emanuele Crialese. It stars Luana Giuliani alongside Penélope Cruz and Vincenzo Amato.

Plot 
Set in 1970s Rome, the fiction tracks the plight of a nuclear family, consisting of an unhappy married couple: Clara (a moody expatriate Spaniard) and Felice (a businessman cheating on Clara with his secretary) and their children Adriana, Gino, and Diana. The eldest child, 12-year-old Adriana (assigned a female at birth) experiences gender dysphoria and identifies as a male and goes by the name of Andrea (a primarily masculine name in Italian). Andrea develops a crush for Sara, a girl who accepts Andrea's gender identity. Upon a shared sense of being outsiders, Andrea and Clara bond closer.

Cast

Production 
The screenplay was written by Crialese, Francesca Manieri and Vittorio Moroni. An Italian-French co-production, L'immensità was produced by Wildside, Warner Bros. Entertainment Italia, Chapter 2, Pathé, and France 3 Cinema.

Release 
The film made its world premiere at the 79th Venice International Film Festival on 4 September 2022. Distributed by Warner Bros. Pictures, it was theatrically released in Italy on 15 September 2022.

Reception 
On review aggregator website Rotten Tomatoes, the film has an approval rating of 85% based on 13 reviews, with an average rating of 5.9/10.

Leslie Felperin of The Hollywood Reporter summed up the film as "a vibrant, if over-crammed, family affair".

Guy Lodge of Variety wrote that the film "is too palpably pained and heartfelt to be called slight, but it's sensitive and peculiar in ways that feel fragile".

Robbie Collin of The Telegraph rated the film 4 out of 5 stars, deeming the "surprisingly autobiographical" picture to be "a child's-eye-view portrait of domestic sadness and the craving for escape from it".

Wendy Ide of ScreenDaily highlighted Cruz's performance as "a cross between Sophia Loren and a solar flare".

Stephanie Bunbury of Deadline Hollywood considered that deep down, the film "is fundamentally quite bleak, but it wears a delightfully cheerful face".

Accolades 

|-
| align = "center" | 2023 || 31st Actors and Actresses Union Awards || Best Actress in an International Production || Penélope Cruz ||  || 
|}

See also 
 List of Italian films of 2022
 List of French films of 2022

References

External links
 

2020s Italian-language films
Italian drama films
French drama films
Films set in Rome
Films set in the 1970s
Italian LGBT-related films
French LGBT-related films
Films about trans men
2022 LGBT-related films
2020s French films
2020s Italian films